James Allan is the Chair of Faculty and Professor of computer science at University of Massachusetts Amherst and was named an ACM Fellow 2020, for his research and contributions to the area of information retrieval. His research has been cited more than 20,000 times (April 2021). In 2019, James Allan was elected to be the treasurer of the Computing Research Association for a term of two years.

References 

American computer scientists
University of Massachusetts Amherst faculty
Year of birth missing (living people)
Living people
Fellows of the Association for Computing Machinery